Show dos Famosos (lit. Show of the Famous) is a Brazilian reality singing competition series. The series is an adaptation of the Spanish format Your Face Sounds Familiar, featuring celebrities portraying various musicians.

The series premiered on April 23, 2017, airing as a one-hour segment during TV Globo's variety show Domingão do Faustão, hosted by Fausto Silva. In 2021, the series moved to Domingão com Huck with Luciano Huck as host. The series is the second Brazilian adaptation of Your Face Sounds Familiar, behind SBT's 2014 series Esse Artista Sou Eu.

Season 1 (2017)

Contestants

Elimination chart

Key
 
 
  Eliminated
  Fourth place
  Third place
  Runner-up
  Winner

Live show details
  Night Winner
  Eliminated

Season 2 (2018)

Contestants

Elimination chart

Key
 
 
  Eliminated
  Fourth place
  Third place
  Runner-up
  Winner

Live show details
  Night Winner
  Eliminated

See also
Show dos Famosos (season 4)

References

2017 Brazilian television series debuts
2017 Brazilian television seasons
Brazilian reality television series
Portuguese-language television shows
Rede Globo original programming